Norwegian Agricultural Inspection Service is a defunct Norwegian government agency that was responsible for inspection of farms and agricultural facilities in the country. As of January 1, 2004 it merged with a number of other agencies to create the Norwegian Food Safety Authority.

History
The agency was created in 1984 when a number of previous independent agencies were merged to create the inspection service. Prior to this each agency had a specialized field for control, including independent agencies for inspection of seeds, plant breeding, plant inspection, toxins, agricultural chemicals, vegetable conservations, margarine and dairy products. None of these had any inter-agency coordination, creating chaos.

External links
 Web site

Defunct government agencies of Norway
Agricultural organisations based in Norway
1984 establishments in Norway
2004 disestablishments in Norway
Ministry of Agriculture and Food (Norway)
Phytosanitary authorities